Demethryus Maciel Areias Nascimento (born 5 April 1999), simply known as Demethryus, is a Brazilian professional footballer who plays as a forward for Greek Super League 2 club Kallithea.

Career statistics

Club

References

1999 births
Living people
Footballers from São Paulo
Brazilian footballers
Association football forwards
Associação Portuguesa de Desportos players
Club Athletico Paranaense players
Figueirense FC players
Associação Atlética Anapolina players